Ann Northrop (born 1948 in Hartford, Connecticut) is a journalist and activist, and the current co-host of TV news program Gay USA.

Early life
Born in Hartford, Connecticut, Northrop is a native of her mother's hometown, Windsor. Northrop's father was a pilot for United Airlines, and the family moved frequently, thus she spent most of her youth in the areas surrounding Hartford, Washington, D.C., Boston, Denver and Chicago. Northrop describes her childhood home as being "very Republican."

When Northrop left home to attend college in 1966, she considered herself to have been indoctrinated into a conservative viewpoint. College proved transformative for Northrop who said, "I’m one of those very dangerous converts – someone who discovered a radical, leftist point of view in my late teens and sort of traveled that road, ideologically, since." Northrop graduated from Vassar College in 1970, where she was instrumental in getting Gloria Steinem to be graduation speaker, during which  Steinem quoted Black Panther Party co-founder Huey Newton.

Career
After college, Northrop worked for the National Journal in Washington, D.C. She reported on all branches of the federal government which included The White House, Congress and the Supreme Court. After a year and a half, Northrop moved to New York City where she worked for WCBS-TV on a program called Woman.

After Woman ended, Northrop worked in WCBS-TV operations, was a freelance production assistant for ABC Sports, wrote for a nationally syndicated newspaper column as well as Ms. and other publications such as Ladies' Home Journal. Northrop acted as the New York officer for a study of thousands of straight and gay couples by Drs. Pepper Schwartz and Philip Blumstein titled "American Couples: Money-Work-Sex".

Northrop returned to regular television production in 1981 as a writer-producer for ABC's Good Morning America. She was then recruited by George Merlis to CBS News in 1982. For five years, Northrop was a producer for the CBS Morning News, planning, coordinating and executing the program on a daily basis. Northrop worked with the show's hosts including Diane Sawyer, Bill Kurtis, Forrest Sawyer, Maria Shriver, Phyllis George, Charlie Rose and Meredith Vieira.

In 1987, Northrop resigned her position at CBS, seeking a change. She chose to become an AIDS and homosexuality educator for New York City's Hetrick-Martin Institute for Lesbian and Gay Youth. After four years as an educator teaching and answering questions by youths and adults alike, she left Hetrick-Martin to pursue other interests.

In 1992, Northrop was the only openly lesbian or gay individual in the New York delegation to the Democratic National Convention. She served for four years as a board member of the Gay Games which were held in New York City in 1994. Northrop helped create the Institute for Gay and Lesbian Strategic Studies, a gay think tank, for which she also served on the board of advisors. She wrote a weekly column for QW, a short-lived New York City gay magazine, and then wrote a regular column for LGNY, a NYC gay newspaper. Northrop was also regularly featured on Dyke TV, a nationally broadcast television program devoted to news, arts and culture from a lesbian perspective, in a political commentary section called Ann Northrop Mouths Off, first appearing on the show in June, 1993.
Northrop has also provided training for activists on how to deal effectively with the news media. She also helped found the Lesbian and Gay Alumnae Association of Vassar College.

Northrop has been a speaker at many events, including the 25th anniversary celebration of the Stonewall riots. She is featured in several books including Making History by Eric Marcus, Wolf Girls at Vassar by Anne MacKay, and Queer in America by Michelangelo Signorile.

In 1996, Northrop became a co-host of the television news program Gay USA. She and fellow anchor Andy Humm present news "...devoted to in-depth coverage of gay, lesbian, bisexual, and transgender issues" on a local, national and international level.

Activism
Northrop became an active demonstrator against the Vietnam War and became involved with the developing feminist movement during the late 1960s and early 1970s.

When Northrop became an AIDS and homosexuality educator, she "...realized the issues were the same that had engaged her as an activist against the Vietnam War and for the feminist movement." Thus, in 1988, Northrop joined the AIDS Coalition to Unleash Power in New York City, known as ACT UP/New York. She became involved in "direct action" demonstrations and was arrested approximately two dozen times for civil disobedience.

In December 1989, Northrop participated in ACT UP's "Stop the Church" protest at St. Patrick's Cathedral in New York City by lying in the center aisle. During the action, over 4,500 activists interrupted Sunday Mass to protest the Catholic Church's opposition to AIDS prevention such as condom distribution and sex education. The documentary film How to Survive a Plague shows part of this action. She, along with 110 other protestors, was arrested. Northrop was later convicted on four misdemeanor charges. She described being in the cathedral on the LGBTQ&A podcast and said, "I happened to be the last person carried out, and by that time, everything had calmed down and was silent. So I started saying — and it was ringing through the cathedral — 'We're fighting for your lives, too. We're fighting for your lives, too,' which I hoped would be effective. Maybe, maybe not...I like to say I got home to watch the second half of the Giants/Broncos game."

Personal life
Northrop came out when she was about 28, working for Ms. magazine, and met a woman she fell in love with, Lynda. Northrop and Lynda were together for 17 years, and raised Lynda's two children from a previous marriage.

References

External links
Meet Ann Northrop at Gay USA
Queer Justice League BlogSpot to which Northrop contributes
Ann Northrop Interview for the ACT UP Oral History Project.

HIV/AIDS activists
American women journalists
American LGBT rights activists
1948 births
Vassar College alumni
Living people
People from Hartford, Connecticut
21st-century American women